Soudan may refer to:

 The French name (and former English name) for the country of Sudan
 The French name for French Sudan (present-day Mali)
 Archaic spelling for the region of Sudan
 Soudan, Minnesota, an unincorporated town near Tower, Minnesota, US
 The Soudan Mine, a former iron mine, now part of a state park
 Soudan 1 and Soudan 2, particle detectors located in the Soudan Mine
 Soudan Banks, a group of reefs in the Indian Ocean, off East Africa
 Fereej Al Soudan, a district in Qatar

Communes in France
 Soudan, Loire-Atlantique
 Soudan, Deux-Sèvres

Surname
 Arlette Soudan-Nonault, Congolese journalist and politician
 Eugène Soudan (1880-1960), Belgian jurist and politician
 Mohamed Soudan (born 1956), senior member of the Egyptian Muslim Brotherhood
 Tim Soudan (born 1968), lacrosse coach and former player

de:Sudan (Begriffsklärung)